Kyaw Swa Khaing (variously spelt Kyaw Swar Khaing, Kyaw Swar Khine) was the Minister of the President's Office of Myanmar (Burma) and a former Deputy Minister for Industry-2.

He held the rank of Major General before resigning his military post to compete in the 2010 Burmese general election.

References

Government ministers of Myanmar
1948 births
People from Yangon
Burmese military personnel
Defence Services Academy alumni
Burmese generals
Union Solidarity and Development Party politicians
Members of Pyithu Hluttaw
2013 deaths